Outlaws of Time: The Last of the Lost Boys is a 2017 young adult novel by N. D. Wilson, published by Katherine Tegen Books. It is the third book in the Outlaws of Time series, being a sequel to The Song of Glory and Ghost.

References

2017 American novels
2017 fantasy novels
American young adult novels
Children's fantasy novels
Novels by N. D. Wilson
Katherine Tegen Books books